The 1902–03 Kentucky State men's basketball team competed on behalf of the University of Kentucky during the 1902–03 season. Kentucky basketball's first season was an unsuccessful one, going 1–2 after losing to in-state Georgetown College Tigers, and Kentucky University Pioneers (Now Transylvania University) and beating the local YMCA team.

Roster

Schedule

|-
!colspan=12 style="background:#273BE2; color:white;"| Regular Season

References

Kentucky
Kentucky Wildcats men's basketball seasons
1902 in sports in Kentucky
1903 in sports in Kentucky